Keithfield Plantation is a historic rice plantation property and national historic district located near Georgetown, Georgetown County, South Carolina.  The district encompasses 1 contributing building, 1 contributing site, and 3 contributing structures.  They include a slave cabin, built about 1830, and agricultural features including examples of historic ricefields, canals, dikes, and trunks. The original main house burned in the mid-20th century. Keithfield was one of several productive rice plantations on the Black River.

It was listed on the National Register of Historic Places in 1988.

References

Slave cabins and quarters in the United States
Plantations in South Carolina
Historic districts on the National Register of Historic Places in South Carolina
Agricultural buildings and structures on the National Register of Historic Places in South Carolina
National Register of Historic Places in Georgetown County, South Carolina
Houses in Georgetown County, South Carolina
Burned houses in the United States